Gabriel Cramer (31 July 1704 – 4 January 1752) was a Genevan mathematician. He was the son of physician Jean Cramer and Anne Mallet Cramer.

Biography 
Cramer showed promise in mathematics from an early age. At 18 he received his doctorate and at 20 he was co-chair of mathematics at the University of Geneva.

In 1728 he proposed a solution to the St. Petersburg Paradox that came very close to the concept of expected utility theory given ten years later by Daniel Bernoulli.

He published his best-known work in his forties. This included his treatise on algebraic curves (1750). It contains the earliest demonstration that a curve of the n-th degree is determined by n(n + 3)/2 points on it, in general position. (See Cramer's theorem (algebraic curves).) This led to the misconception that is Cramer's paradox, concerning the number of intersections of two curves compared to the number of points that determine a curve.

He edited the works of the two elder Bernoullis, and wrote on the physical cause of the spheroidal shape of the planets and the motion of their apsides (1730), and on Newton's treatment of cubic curves (1746).

In 1750 he published Cramer's rule, giving a general formula for the solution for any unknown in a linear equation system having a unique solution, in terms of determinants implied by the system. This rule is still standard.

He did extensive travel throughout Europe in the late 1730s, which greatly influenced his works in mathematics. He died in 1752 at Bagnols-sur-Cèze while traveling in southern France to restore his health.

Selected works 

 Quelle est la cause de la figure elliptique des planètes et de la mobilité de leur aphélies?, Geneva, 1730
 . Geneva: Frères Cramer & Cl. Philibert, 1750

See also
 Cramer–Castillon problem
 Devil's curve
 Jean-Louis Calandrini

References 
 "Gabriel Cramer", in Rousseau et les savants genevois, p. 29 
 W. W. Rouse Ball, A Short Account of the History of Mathematics, (4th Edition, 1908)
 Isaac Benguigui, Gabriel Cramer : illustre mathématicien, 1704–1752, Genève, Cramer & Cie, 1998 
 

  Johann Christoph Strodtmann, « Geschichte des Herrn Gabriel Cramer », in Das neue gelehrte Europa […], 4th part, Meissner, 1754 Also digitized by e-rara.ch

External links

 

1704 births
1752 deaths
18th-century scientists from the Republic of Geneva
Fellows of the Royal Society
18th-century mathematicians
Linear algebraists
Mathematicians from the Republic of Geneva